Bethel Cemetery is a cemetery  at the intersection of US 27 and KY 17 approximately 5 miles north of Falmouth, Pendleton County, Kentucky, at the site of the former Bethel Church. The historic frame church stood at this intersection since its dedication in 1881. The original pews were still in the building and volunteers had recently restored the church when it was destroyed by a tornado in 2015. The land for the church and cemetery was donated by the estate of William J. Bradford.

The Bethel Church was named a Kentucky Landmark in April 2008. The Bethel Cemetery board hoped to have the building listed on the National Register of Historic Places.

John Rarreick (1844–1904) an Indian Campaigns Medal of Honor Recipient, is buried at this cemetery. Also, Private Coleman Reed Asberry (1780–1859), a veteran of the War of 1812, and several veterans of the American Civil War, World War I and World War II are buried in this cemetery.

References

External links
Bethel Cemetery Company, Inc.
History of Bethel Church
News, Bethel Cemetery and Church
Burials at Bethel Cemetery
 
 

Buildings and structures in Pendleton County, Kentucky
Cemeteries in Kentucky
Churches in Kentucky
Churches completed in 1881
19th-century churches in the United States
1881 establishments in Kentucky
Buildings and structures demolished in 2015
2015 disestablishments in Kentucky
Buildings and structures destroyed by tornado